David Michael Bowen (born 3 October 1971) is a former English cricketer.  Bowen was a right-handed batsman.  He was born in Edmonton, London.

Bowen represented the Middlesex Cricket Boardin 3 List A matches.  These came against Cumberland in the 1999 NatWest Trophy and Wiltshire and Sussex in the 2000 NatWest Trophy.  In his 3 List A matches, he scored 63 runs at a batting average of 21.00, with a high score of 29.

References

External links
David Bowen at Cricinfo
David Bowen at CricketArchive

1971 births
Living people
People from Enfield, London
Cricketers from Greater London
English cricketers
Middlesex Cricket Board cricketers